The East Kabika River is a tributary of the Kabika River, flowing into the Cochrane District in Northeastern Ontario, in Canada. The course of this river runs through the townships of Abbotsford, Singer and Hurtubise.

Forestry is the main economic activity of the sector; recreational tourism activities, second. The west side of this slope is served by the Ontario Highway 652.

The surface of the river is usually frozen from early November to mid-May, but safe circulation on the ice generally occurs from mid-November to the end of April.

Geography 
The adjacent hydrographic slopes of the East Kabika River are:
North side: Kabika River, Burntbush River;
East side: Patten River, Turgeon River;
South side: Abitibi Lake, Patten River, La Reine River (Abitibi Lake);
West side: Kabika River, Case River, Kenning River.

The East Kabika River originates at the mouth of a small forest lake in township of Abbotsford.

From the mouth of the small head lake, the East Kabika River flows over  according to the following segments:
 northerly in Abbotsford Township to Abbotsford Creek (coming from the West);
 northerly forming a hook to the east to the boundary of Singer Township;
 northerly winding through Singer Township to the edge of Hurtubise Township;
 north winding through Hurtubise Township to its mouth.

Toponymy
The following names are of the same origin and are in the same area of Cochrane District: Kabika River, Kakiba River East. The term "Kabika" is an African name.

See also 

Kabika River, a watercourse
Burntbush River, a watercourse
Turgeon River, a stream
Harricana River, a watercourse
James Bay
Cochrane District (Ontario)
Northeastern Ontario
List of rivers of Ontario

References

External links 

Rivers of Cochrane District